Air commodore (abbreviated as Air Cdre in the RAF, and PAF; Air Cmde in the IAF, AIR CDRE in the RNZAF and RAAF) is a one-star rank and is an air officer (Flag Rank, Deputy Director General Level) rank which originated in and continues to be used by the Royal Air Force. The rank is also used by the air forces of many countries which have historical British influence such as Zimbabwe, and it is sometimes used as the English translation of an equivalent rank in countries which have a non-English air force-specific rank structure. The name of the rank is always the full phrase; it is never shortened to "commodore", which is a rank in various naval forces.

Air commodore is a one-star rank and is an air officer rank (Flag Rank, Deputy Director General Level), being immediately senior to group captain and immediately subordinate to air vice-marshal. It has a NATO ranking code of OF-6 and is equivalent to a commodore in the Royal Navy or a brigadier in the British Army or the Royal Marines. Unlike these two ranks, however, it has always been a substantive rank. Additionally, air commodores have always been considered to be air officers whilst Royal Navy commodores have not since the Napoleonic Wars been classified as officers of flag rank, and British Army brigadiers have not been considered to be general officers since 1922 when they ceased to be titled as brigadier-generals. In other NATO forces, such as the United States Armed Forces and the Canadian Armed Forces, the equivalent one-star rank is brigadier general.

The equivalent rank in the Women's Auxiliary Air Force, Women's Royal Air Force (until 1968) and Princess Mary's Royal Air Force Nursing Service (until 1980) was "air commandant".

Royal Air Force use and history
In the present-day RAF, air commodores typically hold senior appointments within groups, acting directly in support of the air officer commanding. However, during the inter-war period, and in the case of the contemporary No. 83 Expeditionary Air Group, the air officer commanding held or holds air commodore rank.  In the Air Training Corps, an appointed air commodore holds ultimate authority over the cadet organisation as the Commandant Air Cadets.

Origins
On 1 April 1918, the newly created RAF adopted its officer rank titles from the British Army, with officers at what is now air commodore holding the rank of brigadier-general. In response to the proposal that the RAF should use its own rank titles, it was suggested that the RAF might use the Royal Navy's officer ranks, with the word "air" inserted before the naval rank title. Although the Admiralty objected to this simple modification of their rank titles, it was agreed that the RAF might base many of its officer rank titles on Navy officer ranks with differing pre-modifying terms. It was also suggested that air-officer ranks could be based on the term "ardian", which was derived from a combination of the Gaelic words for "chief" (ard) and "bird" (eun), with the term "fourth ardian" or "flight ardian" being used for the equivalent to brigadier-general and commodore. However, the rank title based on the Navy rank was preferred and air commodore was adopted in August 1919.

RAF insignia, command flag and star plate
The rank insignia is a light-blue band on a broad black band worn on both the lower sleeves of the tunic or on the shoulders of the flying suit or the casual uniform. On the mess uniform, air commodores wear a broad gold ring on both lower sleeves.

The command flag of an air commodore has one narrow red band running through the centre and is rectangular with a cut-away section giving it two tails. It is the only RAF command flag of this shape and it is similar in shape to that of a Royal Navy commodore's broad pennant. The vehicle star plate for an air commodore depicts a single white star (air commodore is equivalent to a one-star rank) on an air force blue background. RAF air commodores are classed as air officers and as such have two rows of gold oak leaves on the peak of their service dress hats.

Honorary air commodores, air commodores-in-chief and air commandants

The reigning monarch may appoint honorary air commodores for RAF flying squadrons and stations. For example, King Charles III is RAF Valley's honorary air commodore and Winston Churchill was 615 Squadron's honorary air commodore. As the title suggests, this is an honorary position bestowed by the reigning monarch and it does not grant the recipient command of a unit or formation. It is designed to strengthen the bond between the military unit and the individual and promote the role of the air force amongst the public.

Serving officers may be granted an equivalent appointment to the honorary rank. In such cases the individual is made an honorary air commandant and they retain their regular rank.

Larger air force organisations or formations may be honoured by having an air commodore-in-chief appointed in their name. These RAF appointments are rare and to date (2020) have been given to just five senior members of the royal family, of whom three were reigning or future monarchs of the United Kingdom. Air commodore-in-chief is not a rank and such an appointment does not convey the rank of air commodore upon the recipient.

Other air forces

Commonwealth of Nations

The rank of air commodore is also used in a number of the air forces in the Commonwealth, including the Bangladesh Air Force, Ghana Air Force, Indian Air Force, Namibian Air Force, Pakistan Air Force, Royal Australian Air Force, Royal New Zealand Air Force, Sri Lanka Air Force and the Trinidad and Tobago Air Guard.

The Royal Canadian Air Force used the rank until the unification of the Canadian Forces in 1968, when army-type rank titles were adopted. An air commodore then became a brigadier-general (following the US Armed Forces title, rather than the British brigadier, which had been held by equivalent officers in the former Canadian Army). In official French Canadian usage, the rank title was commodore de l'air. The position of honorary air commodore still exists in the Royal Canadian Air Cadets. Similarly the rank was replaced by brigadier general in 1973 in the Royal Malaysian Air Force.

As with the RAF, large air force organisations or formations in the other Commonwealth realms may be honoured by having an air commodore-in-chief appointed in their name. These appointments are rare and to date (2020) have been given to just three senior members of the royal familyQueen Elizabeth II, Prince Philip and Prince Charlesin just three non-UK Commonwealth air forces (RCAF, RNZAF, RAAF). Air commodore-in-chief is not a rank and such an appointment does not convey the rank of air commodore upon the recipient.

Non-Commonwealth countries
Air commodore, a is also a rank in the Egyptian Air Force, Royal Air Force of Oman, the Royal Thai Air Force and the Air Force of Zimbabwe.

In the Indonesian Air Force the rank of Komodor Udara, a calque of "air commodore" was used until 1973. The present equivalent is Marsekal Pertama, a calque of "First Marshal" and this is usually translated into English as air commodore.

While the names of most ranks of the Hellenic Air Force (HAF) are Greek language calques of RAF ranks, the HAF equivalent of O-7/OF-6 is Taxiarchos tis aeroporias, which may be literally translated from modern Greek as "brigadier of the air force" (or "aviation brigadier"). (A free translation of the army rank of taxiarchis, which originated in ancient Greece, is "one who orders" and the Greek root τάξις taxis is also the basis of the aviation term taxi – that is, to move one or more aircraft on the ground.) Nevertheless, Taxiarchos tis aeroporias is normally rendered into English as "air commodore" and the rank was introduced during the Second World War, after the Greek armed forces were reconstituted in exile, often alongside or within Commonwealth military formations, such as RAF Middle East Command.

Other air forces have, or once had, an equivalent rank named simply commodore (or a derived term such as comodoro), without the qualifying prefix "air". Examples include the Argentinian Air Force, Chilean Air Force, and Royal Netherlands Air Force. Such a rank often has essentially the same rank insignia as that of an RAF air commodore.

See also

 Air force officer rank insignia
 Comparison of United Kingdom and United States military ranks
 List of comparative military ranks
 RAF officer ranks
 Ranks of the Royal Australian Air Force

References

Military ranks of the Commonwealth
Military ranks of Australia
Former military ranks of Canada
Military ranks of the Royal Air Force
Pakistan Air Force ranks
Military ranks of Bangladesh
Military ranks of Sri Lanka
Air force ranks
One-star officers